Wahala is a 2022 fiction novel by British Nigerian writer Nikki May. Her debut novel, it was originally published by Custom House an imprint of HarperCollins in 2022. May's debut novel follows  the friendship three Anglo-Nigerian women whose friendship are threatened by a Russian Nigerian woman.

Development 
May's stated that she got the inspiration for the novel after having a lunch at a Nigerian restaurant in London and while on a train ride back home she thought about how she changed from the Nigerian she was in the dinner to an English woman. The clash of Nigerian and English cultures made her write the first parts of the book in the train. She finished writing the novel after 18 months and the title of the novel; Wahala means trouble in Nigerian Pidgin.

The book deals with themes of racism, gender and identity all inspired by May's personal life when she moved from Nigeria to London as a biracial woman.

In May 2021, six months before it publication, it was optioned by BBC to be adapted into a TV series.

Plot 
Set in London, Ronke, Simi and Boo are friends who met a university in Bristol 17 years ago, they are biracial having English mothers and Nigerian fathers.
Their friendship is crushed when Isobel, Simi's childhood friend and a rich and influential girl, insists on being the centre of every conversation; she knows the secrets that the three friends are keeping from each other.

Characters 
 Ronke — A dentist who is currently single and is looking for a nigerian husband.
 Simi — A fashion marketer whose husband wants a child she is not ready for. She suffers from impostor syndrome. 
 Boo — A research scientist and housewife struggling with internalized racism, due to her biological father having left her mother before she was born. She takes care of her daughter, Sofia, alongside her husband, Didier, while looking for more excitement in her life.
 Isobel Babangari — A Russian Nigerian who is Simi's rich and influential childhood friend who begin to destroy the rich friendship. 
 Kayode — Ronke's Nigerian boyfriend. 
 Martin — Simi's Husband
 Didier — Boo's French husband
 Sofia — Didier and Boo's daughter

Reception 
The book received generally positive reception from book reviewers and readers alike. It was rated as one of the most anticipated books of 2022. 
A starred review from Kirkus Reviews called the novel "A fascinating look at the dark side of female friendship”.  Another review by NPR stated that "Wahala is both great fun and extremely smart in how it captures some of the central issues in modern city living". A review from Publishers Weekly noted that "May’s nuanced exploration of race and gender makes this refreshing.”

Adaptation 
In May 2021, it was announced that BBC had optioned the novel for a TV series with Theresa Ikoko, who is known for her work in Knocks writing the screenplay. Wahala will be produced by Firebird Pictures, with its founder Elizabeth Kilgarriff as the executive producer alongside Mona Qureshi. BBC Studios had also gained the rights to distribute the series worldwide.

References 

Novels set in Nigeria
2022 debut novels
Novels set in London
2022 British novels
Nigerian English-language novels
British thriller novels
2022 Nigerian novels